Garuk or Goruk may refer to:
 Garuk, Hormozgan
 Garuk-e Bala, Hormozgan Province
 Garuk-e Pain, Hormozgan Province
 Garuk, Narmashir, Kerman Province
 Garuk, Ravar, Kerman Province
 Garuk, Eskelabad, Khash County, Sistan and Baluchestan Province
 Garuk, South Khorasan